AEK B.C. in international competitions is the history and statistics of AEK B.C. in FIBA Europe, Euroleague Basketball Company competitions and FIBA Intercontinental Cup.

AEK Athens has won two FIBA Saporta Cups, one FIBA Basketball Champions League and one FIBA Intercontinental Cup.

Honours

FIBA Intercontinental Cup:  2019
FIBA Euroleague:  1997–98,  2000–01
FIBA Champions League:  2017–18,   2019–20
FIBA Saporta Cup:  1967–68,  1969–70,  1999–00

Final-4 

 FIBA Euroleague: 1965–66

FIBA European competitions record

FIBA Intercontinental Cup record

Record by country of opposition

{|class="wikitable sortable" style="text-align:center" 
! rowspan=2| Country
! colspan=7| Home
! colspan=7| Away
! colspan=8| Total
|-
! Pld
! W
! D
! L
! PF
! PA
! PD
! Pld
! W
! D
! L
! PF
! PA
! PD
! Pld
! W
! D
! L
! PF
! PA
! PD
! Win%
|-
|-bgcolor="#CCFFCC"
| align=left| 
| 1
| 0
| 0
| 0
| 0
| 0
| 0
| 1
| 1
| 0
| 0
| 86
| 64
| +22
| 1
| 1
| 0
| 0
| 86
| 64
| +22
| 
|-
|-bgcolor="#CCFFCC"
| align=left| 
| 1
| 1
| 0
| 0
| 100
| 63
| +37
| 1
| 1
| 0
| 0
| 118
| 88
| +30
| 2
| 2
| 0
| 0
| 218
| 151
| +67
| 
|-
|-bgcolor="#CCFFCC"
| align=left| 
| 1
| 1
| 0
| 0
| 95
| 69
| +26
| 1
| 1
| 0
| 0
| 95
| 90
| +5
| 2
| 2
| 0
| 0
| 190
| 159
| +31
| 
|-
|-bgcolor="#CCFFCC"
| align=left| 
| 10
| 9
| 0
| 1
| 825
| 688
| +137
| 10
| 4
| 0
| 6
| 727
| 787
| -60
| 20
| 13
| 0
| 7
| 1,552
| 1,475
| +77
| 
|-
|-bgcolor="#CCFFCC"
| align=left| 
| 1
| 1
| 0
| 0
| 86
| 70
| +16
| 0
| 0
| 0
| 0
| 0
| 0
| 0
| 1
| 1
| 0
| 0
| 86
| 70
| +16
| 
|-
|-bgcolor="#CCFFCC"
| align=left| 
| 5
| 5
| 0
| 0
| 453
| 330
| +123
| 5
| 1
| 0
| 4
| 354
| 428
| -74
| 10
| 6
| 0
| 4
| 807
| 758
| +49
| 
|-
|-bgcolor="#CCFFCC"
| align=left| 
| 11
| 9
| 0
| 2
| 881
| 775
| +106
| 11
| 5
| 0
| 6
| 822
| 849
| -27
| 22
| 14
| 0
| 8
| 1,703
| 1,624
| +79
| 
|-
|-bgcolor="#CCFFCC"
| align=left| 
| 1
| 1
| 0
| 0
| 93
| 54
| +39
| 1
| 1
| 0
| 0
| 106
| 73
| +33
| 2
| 2
| 0
| 0
| 199
| 127
| +72
| 
|-
|-bgcolor="#CCFFCC"
| align=left| 
| 5
| 4
| 0
| 1
| 425
| 402
| +23
| 6
| 4
| 0
| 2
| 504
| 548
| -44
| 11
| 8
| 0
| 3
| 929
| 950
| -21
| 
|-
|-bgcolor="#CCFFCC"
| align=left| 
| 2
| 2
| 0
| 0
| 160
| 111
| +49
| 2
| 2
| 0
| 0
| 152
| 135
| +17
| 4
| 4
| 0
| 0
| 312
| 246
| +66
| 
|-
|-bgcolor="#FFBBBB"
| align=left| 
| 25
| 17
| 0
| 8
| 1,955
| 1,816
| +139
| 26
| 7
| 1
| 18
| 1,884
| 2,081
| -197
| 51
| 24
| 1
| 26
| 3,839
| 3,897
| -58
| 
|-
|-bgcolor="#CCFFCC"
| align=left| 
| 15
| 10
| 0
| 5
| 1,186
| 1,144
| +42
| 15
| 5
| 0
| 10
| 1,105
| 1,148
| -43
| 30
| 15
| 0
| 15
| 2,291
| 2,292
| -1
| 
|-
|-bgcolor="#FFBBBB"
| align=left| 
| 4
| 1
| 0
| 3
| 277
| 284
| -7
| 4
| 1
| 0
| 3
| 315
| 319
| -4
| 8
| 2
| 0
| 6
| 592
| 603
| -11
| 
|-
|-bgcolor="#CCFFCC"
| align=left| 
| 7
| 5
| 0
| 2
| 617
| 502
| +115
| 7
| 4
| 0
| 3
| 603
| 587
| +16
| 14
| 9
| 0
| 5
| 1,220
| 1,089
| +131
| 
|-
|-bgcolor="#CCFFCC"
| align=left| 
| 12
| 10
| 0
| 2
| 913
| 791
| +122
| 12
| 5
| 0
| 7
| 877
| 892
| -15
| 24
| 15
| 0
| 9
| 1,790
| 1,683
| +107
| 
|-
|-bgcolor="#FFBBBB"
| align=left| 
| 26
| 18
| 0
| 8
| 1,967
| 1,911
| +56
| 26
| 6
| 0
| 20
| 1,842
| 2,168
| -326
| 52
| 24
| 0
| 28
| 3,809
| 4,079
| -270
| 
|-
|-bgcolor="#CCFFCC"
| align=left| 
| 1
| 1
| 0
| 0
| 88
| 79
| +9
| 1
| 0
| 0
| 1
| 76
| 92
| -16
| 2
| 1
| 0
| 1
| 164
| 171
| -7
| 
|-
|-bgcolor="#CCFFCC"
| align=left| 
| 9
| 7
| 0
| 2
| 746
| 692
| +54
| 9
| 5
| 0
| 4
| 733
| 734
| -1
| 18
| 12
| 0
| 6
| 1,479
| 1,426
| +53
| 
|-
|-bgcolor="#CCFFCC"
| align=left| 
| 1
| 1
| 0
| 0
| 114
| 72
| +42
| 1
| 1
| 0
| 0
| 106
| 81
| +25
| 2
| 2
| 0
| 0
| 220
| 153
| +67
| 
|-
|-bgcolor="#CCFFCC"
| align=left| 
| 1
| 1
| 0
| 0
| 66
| 61
| +5
| 1
| 0
| 0
| 1
| 63
| 74
| -11
| 2
| 1
| 0
| 1
| 129
| 135
| -6
| 
|-
|-bgcolor="#CCFFCC"
| align=left| 
| 2
| 2
| 0
| 0
| 220
| 120
| +100
| 2
| 2
| 0
| 0
| 197
| 176
| +21
| 4
| 4
| 0
| 0
| 417
| 296
| +121
| 
|-
|-bgcolor="#CCFFCC"
| align=left| 
| 2
| 1
| 0
| 1
| 150
| 150
| 0
| 2
| 1
| 0
| 1
| 87
| 102
| -15
| 4
| 2
| 0
| 2
| 237
| 252
| -15
| 
|-
|-bgcolor="#CCFFCC"
| align=left| 
| 5
| 5
| 0
| 0
| 403
| 369
| +34
| 5
| 4
| 0
| 1
| 379
| 356
| +23
| 10
| 9
| 0
| 1
| 782
| 725
| +57
| 
|-
|-bgcolor="#CCFFCC"
| align=left| 
| 1
| 1
| 0
| 0
| 118
| 84
| +34
| 1
| 1
| 0
| 0
| 89
| 77
| +12
| 2
| 2
| 0
| 0
| 207
| 161
| +46
| 
|-
|-bgcolor="#CCFFCC"
| align=left| 
| 8
| 6
| 0
| 2
| 662
| 612
| +50
| 7
| 3
| 0
| 4
| 514
| 548
| -34
| 15
| 9
| 0
| 6
| 1,176
| 1,160
| +16
| 
|-
|-bgcolor="#FFBBBB"
| align=left| 
| 10
| 6
| 0
| 4
| 855
| 811
| +44
| 10
| 3
| 0
| 7
| 714
| 882
| -168
| 20
| 9
| 0
| 11
| 1,569
| 1,693
| -124
| 
|-
|-bgcolor="#CCFFCC"
| align=left| 
| 8
| 7
| 0
| 1
| 652
| 580
| +72
| 8
| 3
| 0
| 5
| 608
| 587
| +21
| 16
| 10
| 0
| 6
| 1,260
| 1,167
| +93
| 
|-
|-bgcolor="#FFBBBB"
| align=left| 
| 19
| 12
| 0
| 7
| 1,434
| 1,370
| +64
| 18
| 3
| 0
| 15
| 1,234
| 1,431
| -197
| 37
| 15
| 0
| 22
| 2,668
| 2,801
| -133
| 
|-
|-bgcolor="#CCFFCC"
| align=left| 
| 1
| 1
| 0
| 0
| 123
| 98
| +25
| 1
| 1
| 0
| 0
| 107
| 92
| +15
| 2
| 2
| 0
| 0
| 230
| 190
| +40
| 
|-
|-bgcolor="#CCFFCC"
| align=left| 
| 1
| 1
| 0
| 0
| 73
| 55
| +18
| 1
| 0
| 0
| 1
| 100
| 113
| -13
| 2
| 1
| 0
| 1
| 173
| 168
| +5
| 
|-
|-bgcolor="#CCFFCC"
| align=left| 
| 14
| 9
| 0
| 5
| 1067
| 1045
| +22
| 14
| 6
| 0
| 8
| 1007
| 1056
| -49
| 28
| 15
| 0
| 13
| 2,074
| 2,101
| -27
| 
|-class="sortbottom"
! align=left|Total
!211
!155
!0
!56
!16,804
!15,208
!+1,596
!207
!81
!1
!125
!15,604
!16,658
!-1,054
!418
!236
!1
!181
!32,408
!31,866
!+542
!

 Last entry is the second match against Galatasaray Nef for the 2022–23 Basketball Champions League Round of 16.
 The record after the last entry is 418 matches in total (236W, 1D, 181L, PF32,408, PA31,866), with 211 home matches (155W, 0D, 56L, PF16,804, PA15,208) and 207 away matches (81W, 1D, 125L, PF15,604, PA16,658).
Single games are considered home or away according to the team's allocation after a FIBA competition draw.

Statistics record by competition 
AEK has overall, from 1958–59 (first participation) to 2022–23 (current participation): 236 wins and 1 draw against 181 defeats in 418 games for all European and worldwide basketball club competitions.

FIBA Intercontinental Cup: 2–0 (2)
FIBA Euroleague: 80–74 (154)
FIBA Champions League: 68–1–37 (106) 
FIBA Saporta Cup: 44–26 (70)
FIBA EuroCup: 8–14 (22) 
FIBA Korać Cup: 34–30 (64)

See also
 Greek basketball clubs in international competitions

References

External links
FIBA (official website)
EuroLeague (official website)
FIBA Champions League (official website)
FIBA EuroCup (official website)
ULEB (official website)
FIBA Saporta Cup Final Game 2000 - AEK Athens vs. Kinder Bologna (youtube)
AS Monaco v AEK - Final - Full Game - Basketball Champions League 2017-18 (youtube)
AEK v Flamengo - Final - Full Game - FIBA Intercontinental Cup 2019 (youtube)

Europe
Greek basketball clubs in European and worldwide competitions